Qorqaçıq raiway junction settlement is a rural locality (a posyolok) in Biektaw District, Tatarstan. The population was 1850 as of 2010.

Geography 
Qorqaçıq railway junction settlement is located 17 km northeast of Biektaw, district's administrative centre, and 43 km northeast of Qazan, republic's capital, by road.

History 
The village was established in 1920s.

Since its establishment was a part of Arça Canton. After the creation of districts in Tatar ASSR (Tatarstan) in Arça (1930–1935), Biektaw (1935–1963),  Piträç (1963–1965) and Biektaw districts.

References

External links 
 

Rural localities in Vysokogorsky District